Roswell Wright House is a historic home located at Unadilla in Otsego County, New York, United States. It was built originally in 1823 and is a dwelling in the Greek Revival style.  It is a two-story, timber frame, rectangular, temple-front dwelling with a series of later additions off the rear. The front features a portico supported by four wood columns with Ionic order capitals.

It was listed on the National Register of Historic Places in 1988.

References

Houses on the National Register of Historic Places in New York (state)
Houses completed in 1823
Houses in Otsego County, New York
National Register of Historic Places in Otsego County, New York